Kazantsevo is a rural locality (a selo) and the administrative center of Kazanskoye Rural Settlement of Talmensky District, Altai Krai, Russia. The population was 128 in 2016. There are 10 streets.

Geography 
Kazantsevo is located 42 km northwest of Talmenka (the district's administrative centre) by road. Malinovka is the nearest rural locality.

References 

Rural localities in Talmensky District